William Brent Unger (born October 15, 1995) is an American actor. He is known for playing Chase on the Disney XD series Lab Rats and Lab Rats: Elite Force. Credited as Billy Unger before 2016, starting with Lab Rats: Elite Force, he is credited as William Brent.

Personal life
Unger was born in Palm Beach County, Florida. He moved to Hollywood with his family in 2006.

Career
Since moving to LA, Unger has guest starred on Disney XD's Kickin' It, Disney Channel's Sonny with a Chance and A.N.T. Farm, and on No Ordinary Family, Ghost Whisperer, Hawthorne, Terminator: The Sarah Connor Chronicles, Mental, Medium, Desperate Housewives, Cold Case, and Scrubs. He also made an appearance on The Tonight Show with Jay Leno.

Unger has appeared in the films National Treasure: Book of Secrets, You Again, Monster Mutt, Opposite Day, Jack and the Beanstalk, and Rock Slyde.

Beginning in 2012 he began starring as Chase, the youngest of the super-human bionic teens, in the Disney XD series Lab Rats. In 2016, he continued to play Chase on the Lab Rats spinoff series Lab Rats: Elite Force, now credited as William Brent.

Filmography

Film

Television

Video games

Awards and nominations

References

External links

1995 births
Living people
Male actors from Florida
American male child actors
American male film actors
American male television actors
American male voice actors
American male video game actors
21st-century American male actors
People from Palm Beach County, Florida